The Peterson–Burr House is a historic two-story house in Salina, Utah. It was built in 1900 by P. J. Peterson, an immigrant from Denmark who became a furniture and hardware store owner in Salina, and served as the mayor  and as a member of the Utah State Legislature. The house was designed in the Queen Anne architectural style. It belonged to Gilbert M. Burr, a car dealer and Mormon bishop, from 1919 to 1982, and it was remodelled as a bed and breakfast in 1983. It has been listed on the National Register of Historic Places since February 18, 1994.

References

National Register of Historic Places in Sevier County, Utah
Queen Anne architecture in Utah
Houses completed in 1900
1900 establishments in Utah
Houses on the National Register of Historic Places in Utah